Go 101 was a Melbourne-based funk/pop band formed by David Wilson and Daniel Alan of the band Hue & Cry. Their debut single "Build It Up" saw them nominated for three awards at the ARIA Music Awards of 1989.

The band guested in Australian soap opera Neighbours in 1990.

Band members
David Wilson - keyboards, vocals
Daniel Alan - drums
Steven Brooks - guitar
Simon Kershaw - keyboards
Peter Badenoch - bass
James Allmand - keyboards

Discography

Studio albums

Singles

Awards

ARIA Music Awards
The ARIA Music Awards is an annual awards ceremony that recognises excellence, innovation, and achievement across all genres of Australian music. Go 101 were nominated for three awards.

|-
| rowspan="3"| 1989
| rowspan="3"| "Build It up"
| ARIA Award for Best New Talent
| 
|-
| ARIA Award for Breakthrough Artist – Single
| 
|-
| ARIA Award for Highest Selling Single
| 
|-

References

Australian funk musical groups
Musical groups established in 1987
Musical groups disestablished in 1990